Togo competed in the Olympic Games for the first time at the 1972 Summer Olympics in Munich, West Germany. Seven competitors, all men, took part in five events in three sports.

Athletics

Men
Track & road events

Field events

Boxing

Men

Cycling

Three cyclists represented Togo in 1972.

Road

References

External links
Official Olympic Reports

Nations at the 1972 Summer Olympics
1972
Summer Olympics